Sukie Smith (born 23 September 1964) is a British actress and musician. Her credits include the role of Rachel Branning in EastEnders in 2006, as well as appearances in Peak Practice and Doctors. She also appeared in several films, including Lawless Heart and Topsy Turvy.

She is an accomplished composer and has written the soundtrack for Hush Your Mouth, the debut feature for Neophyte Films directed by Tom Tyrwhitt. Smith writes and records songs and poems, which are performed under the name Madam. She has collaborated with artists such as Saskia Volde to make the Tate Gallery exhibited piece "Placebo". Her shows are regularly attended by English artists such as Georgina Starr, Paul Noble and Tim Noble and Sue Webster.

Filmography

References

External links

Madam

1964 births
English actresses
British soap opera actresses
Living people
People from Rochford